Alex Mayer may refer to:

 Alex Mayer (born 1981), British politician
 Sandy Mayer (born 1952), tennis player